Ermanno Palmieri (born September 9, 1921 in Civitavecchia; died in 1982) was an Italian professional football player.

He played 1 game in the Serie A for A.S. Roma in the 1948/49 season.

See also
Football in Italy
List of football clubs in Italy

References

1921 births
1982 deaths
People from Civitavecchia
Italian footballers
Serie A players
A.S. Roma players
U.S. Catanzaro 1929 players
Association football forwards
A.S.D. Civitavecchia 1920 players
Footballers from Lazio
Sportspeople from the Metropolitan City of Rome Capital